Pinaverium bromide (INN) is a medication used for functional gastrointestinal disorders.  It belongs to a drug group called antispasmodics and acts as a calcium channel blocker in helping to restore the normal contraction process of the bowel. It is most effective when taken for a full course of treatment and is not designed for immediate symptom relief or sporadic, intermittent use.

Pinaverium bromide was first registered in 1975 by Solvay Pharmaceuticals (now a division of Abbott Laboratories), and marketed globally using the brand names Dicetel and Eldicet. Generic pinaverium is available in South Korea under a trade name of Disten and in Argentina as Nulite.

Indications
It is indicated for the treatment and relief of symptoms associated with irritable bowel syndrome (IBS) including abdominal pain, bowel disturbances and intestinal discomfort; and treatment of symptoms related to functional disorders of biliary tract.

References

Calcium channel blockers
Quaternary ammonium compounds
Morpholines
AbbVie brands
Phenol ethers
Ethers
Organobromides